Mstar may refer to:
 MStar Semiconductor, a Taiwanese semiconductor manufacturer
 MSTAR, a battlefield radar manufactured in the United Kingdom by Thales
 Mstar (Internet service provider), a Utah internet service provider